Horseshoe Theory is a 2017 American short romantic comedy film written and directed by Jonathan Daniel Brown, co-written by Travis Harrington and produced by Joe Toronto, Jon Sautter and Travis Harrington. The film premiered at the 2017 Slamdance Film Festival in Park City, Utah where it won a special jury award.

The title is a reference to the horseshoe theory in politics.

Plot 
After arranging a weapons deal over the internet, a white supremacist named Bobbo and a jihadist named Abdul meet behind a diner. Over the course of an evening, they both discover they have more in common than either of the two could have realized.

Cast 

 Jackson Rathbone as Bobbo
 Amir Malaklou as Abdul
 Lily Mae Harrington as Waitress
 Travis Harrington as Radio Host

Filming 
The filming of Horseshoe Theory took place in Mojave, California and Tarzana, Los Angeles over two days. The film was shot digitally using the Red Dragon camera. The film's poster was designed by Kari Kilpela.

Release 
On January 21, 2017, Horseshoe Theory had its world premiere at the Slamdance Film Festival in Park City, Utah.

Film festivals

References

External links 
 

2017 films
2017 LGBT-related films
American LGBT-related short films
Films about LGBT and religion
LGBT-related political films
American romantic comedy films
Films shot in Los Angeles
2010s English-language films
2010s American films